The Haunted Castle is a hypothetical lost 1897 British film, attributed in some filmographies to the British film pioneer George Albert Smith, but which may be a misidentification of a French film by Georges Méliès.

Many of Smith's films show an interest in supernatural themes, such as Photographing a Ghost (1898), The Haunted Picture Gallery (1899), and his major short comedy Mary Jane's Mishap (1903); he also filmed a version of the Faust legend. A film called The Haunted Castle, supposedly released by Smith in December 1897, was attributed to him in the 1973 edition of The British Film Catalogue.

However, the film historian John Barnes, in his book-length study of the year 1897 in British film, concluded that the title referred to a Méliès film that had been referenced in England since May of that year. Méliès's 1897 film Le Château hanté was indeed released in Britain as The Haunted Castle. (A slightly earlier film of his, Le Manoir du diable, made in the winter of 1896–7, is also known as The Haunted Castle after its American release title.)

Notes

External links

1897 films
1897 horror films
1890s British films
British horror films
British silent short films
British haunted house films
Films directed by George Albert Smith
Films set in castles
British black-and-white films
1890s ghost films
1897 short films
Silent horror films